The V. S. Achuthanandan ministry was a Kerala government ministry formed on 18 May 2006 by V. S. Achuthanandan, after the victory of the Left Democratic Front (LDF) coalition in the 2006 Kerala Legislative Assembly election. It was dissolved on 16 May 2011, after the chief minister resigned on 14 May 2011, following the LDF's defeat in the 2011 Kerala Legislative Assembly election. The V.S. government had twenty ministers.

Ministers

Ex-ministers 
Four ministers relinquished office during the tenure of the government:
 P. J. Joseph, Minister for Public Works (Resigned on 04-09-2006 after Airline Travel scam, returned on 17-08-2009 after acquittal, and again resigned on 30-04-2010, after his controversial merger of Kerala Congress (J), his party, with Kerala Congress (M), led by K. M. Mani)
 Mons Joseph, Minister for Public Works (Took office on 18-10-2007, after the resignation of T. U. Kuruvila, and resigned on 16-08-2009 for welcoming P. J. Joseph)
 T. U. Kuruvilla, Minister for Public Works (Took office on 15-09-2006, after the resignation of P. J. Joseph, and resigned on 04-09-2007 after Rajakumari land scam)
 Mathew T. Thomas, Minister for Transport (Resigned on 16-03-2009, as a part of internal arrangements of their party to pave way for Jose Thettayil)

See also 
 Chief Minister of Kerala
 List of Chief Ministers of Kerala
 List of Kerala ministers

References

Achuthanandan
Communist Party of India (Marxist) state ministries
2006 establishments in Kerala
2011 disestablishments in India
Cabinets established in 2006
Cabinets disestablished in 2011
Janata Dal (Secular) ministries